The Arm of the Law is a 1932 American pre-Code action film directed by Louis King and starring Rex Bell, Marceline Day and Lina Basquette. It was distributed by Monogram Pictures.

Synopsis
A reporter investigates the murder of a nightclub dancer who had become involved in a divorce case.

Cast
 Rex Bell as Robin Dale
 Marceline Day as Sandy
 Lina Basquette as Zelma Shaw
 Dorothy Revier as 	Mrs. Estelle Brandess
 Bryant Washburn as John Welling
 Donald Keith as Billy Treat
 Robert Frazer as Gregory Brandess
 Robert Emmett O'Connor as Detective Captain Blake
 Dorothy Christy as Mrs. Myrtle Welling
 Larry Banthim as 	Police Sergeant Jardin
 Gilbert Clayton as 	Dr. Wattles
 Wallace MacDonald as Newspaper Reporter
 William V. Mong as Bailey
 Fred 'Snowflake' Toones as Jackson
 Gordon De Main as Coroner

References

Bibliography
 Katchmer, George A. Eighty Silent Film Stars: Biographies and Filmographies of the Obscure to the Well Known. McFarland, 1991.

External links
 

1932 films
1930s action films
1930s English-language films
American action films
American black-and-white films
Films directed by Louis King
Monogram Pictures films
1930s American films